American High School or American Senior High School may refer to:
 American High School (California)
 American Senior High School (Miami-Dade County, Florida)
 American High School (film), a 2009 romantic comedy film
 American High (TV series)